Nick Arcade (also stylized Nickelodeon Arcade) is an American children's game show created by James Bethea and Karim Miteff and hosted by Phil Moore, with Andrea Lively announcing, that aired on Nickelodeon in 1992 (in the first season, the shows were taped in December 1991 and aired in early 1992), airing originally during weekend afternoons, with reruns airing until September 28, 1997. It was taped at Nickelodeon Studios at Universal Studios Florida in Orlando. In Nick Arcade, two teams of contestants played two initial trivia rounds, with the winner advancing to the "Video Zone" to play against the virtual "Video Game Wizard" of the day.

The show's format combined video game trivia with contestant-interactive virtual reality. The virtual reality games were designed by Bethea and Miteff for Bethea/Miteff Productions and programmed by Curt Toumainian for Saddleback/Live Studios and Dean Friedman (for InVideo Systems). The show was the first in America to regularly intermix live action with animation using a bluescreen.

Gameplay 

Two teams of contestants played two initial rounds, with the winner advancing to play against the "Video Game Wizard" of the day.

Face-off 
Each round would start with one player from each team playing a video game for thirty seconds. The games here were designed specifically for the show and are listed below.

These custom Face-Off games were developed by Bethea/Miteff Productions in conjunction with Saddleback/Live Studios and Psygnosis.

The winner of the face-off won 25 (first round) or 50 points (second round) for their team. If the face-off ended in a tie, a toss-up question was asked. The team also earned control of the game's cartoon mascot, "Mikey, the Video Adventurer".

Main rounds 
In the main rounds, Mikey would be navigated over a thematic game-board by the teams. One team was Red, with the other Yellow (the latter, which was traditionally Blue in most Nickelodeon team-vs.-team game shows, was likely changed due to the Video Zone's blue chroma key setup). The game-board was divided into 18 squares, and Mikey was moved around the board in one of four basic directions (up, down, left, or right) toward a "Goal" space on the board. When new squares were landed on, various events would be uncovered, including trivia quizzes, video-based puzzles, bonus instant-win prizes, automatic point-adding squares, enemies and "Video Challenges." The latter involved one player of the team playing one of five video games in an attempt to beat a certain score or accomplish a certain objective within 30 seconds. Regardless of the outcome, both teams kept any prizes won during the first two rounds of the game.

The object was to get Mikey to the Goal, as discussed above. More often than not, the round would end prematurely due to time constraints. In such cases, Mikey was moved directly to the goal, and a question was asked; the first team to buzz in with the correct answer received the "Goal" points. After the round ends, the contents of the remaining squares were revealed. Round 2 was played the same way, but with point values doubled.

Mikey's World 
Mikey's World had 11 different areas of exploration. These areas included:

Moving Mikey 
There were eight different types of spaces Mikey could land on:

 The Four Ps ("Points, Puzzles, Pop Quizzes, and Prizes"):
 Points - The team that moved Mikey was automatically awarded 25 points (50 in round 2) and kept control.
 Video Puzzle - Different puzzles were played. The team that solved the puzzle received 25 points (50 in Round 2) and control of Mikey. Examples of video puzzles included identifying the artist in a music video with a scrambled picture and recalling a series of images flashed rapidly on the screen.
 Pop Quiz - A question was asked that related to the area Mikey was traveling. The teams could buzz-in during the middle of the question. If a team answered correctly, they earned 25 points (50 in Round 2) and control of Mikey. (In early episodes, the team in control of Mikey would choose one of four categories.)
 Prize - The team that moved Mikey won a prize and kept control. Any prize the team received was theirs to keep, regardless of the game's outcome.
 Video Challenge - One of the contestants from a team chose one of five video games on stage to play (each of which could be played only once during an episode). The goal was to beat the "Wizard's Challenge" (renamed "Expert's Challenge" in Season 2), which was usually to achieve a certain score within 30 seconds for the game chosen. The other team member had three seconds (although it usually was not enforced) to write, using a Magna-Doodle, how much of their score they would gamble that the partner could complete the challenge. If the player met or beat the challenge, the wager was added to their score, and the team kept control of Mikey. If not, they lost the wager and the other team gained control. Teams could wager any amount from zero to their current score or the value of one question in that round if the team had less. In the event the other team member wagered more points than their current score, the wager was rounded down to their current score, only if the challenge was won. Each game could be played only once during an episode, and when it was chosen, the marquee light was turned off (though the game continued to run in attract mode). Only games with constantly visible on-screen score displays were used. Consoles used for this part of the show were the Nintendo Entertainment System, Super Nintendo Entertainment System, Sega Genesis, Turbografx-16 and Neo Geo.
 Enemy - An animated enemy, which changed with the setting of the game board and "attacked" Mikey.  Landing on an enemy square forfeited control to the opposing team.  Examples include the town bully in "Mikey's Neighborhood" and a genie in a Middle-Eastern themed level.
 Time Bomb - In the rare occurrence that Mikey moved to a space that had already been landed on, a "Time Bomb" would occur. The team controlling Mikey had 10 seconds to spell a word, alternating letters back and forth between team members. If a team correctly "pong-spelled" a word, they kept control; otherwise, the other team would gain control. Regardless of the outcome, no points were awarded. 
 Goal - The Goal worked in two ways. If the team that moved Mikey moved him to the Goal, they alone were asked a question based on a category their opponents chose from a list of four categories (three in season 2). A correct answer earned 50 points in Round 1 (100 in Round 2) and the Goal for that round. If they answered incorrectly, the opponents got half the points available and the Goal by default. If time ran out before Mikey reached the goal, a sudden-death Pop Quiz question was asked for 50 points (100 in Round 2).

The team with the most points at the end of two rounds won the game. If the game ended in a tie, a 100-point tiebreaker question was asked. The winning team advanced to the Video Zone.  The losing team received consolation prizes as well as any other prizes acquired during the game.

The Video Zone 
The Video Zone was actually a live-action video game with three levels. Using a video monitor to see themselves, the contestants would be backstage, climbing ladders, throwing "snowballs", and using a boat in front of a bluescreen attempting to achieve previously explained goals (which was always to obtain three objects) for each level of the game.

As in a traditional video game, players could be "damaged" by hazards and enemy characters. If they lost all of their power (five units, as shown by an on-screen gauge), the screen would fade to grey, and they would have to start the stage over and repeat its objectives until successful (a couple of season 1 episodes had a message that read "Try again. Press START to continue.").  In addition, each level contained a 'power-up' that appeared periodically that, when touched, gave the player an added advantage in that level—destroying all onscreen enemies, freezing enemies for 5 seconds (rendering them harmless), restoring the team's power meter to maximum, etc.

The team had 60 seconds to clear all three levels. Each item touched won the team $50 to split, and each level cleared won a prize of increasing value. Successfully beating the Game Wizard in the final level won the grand prize, which was usually a vacation. If time ran out before the team completed the game, the losing horns (in the style of an evil laugh) sounded, the screen faded to red, and the words "GAME OVER" appeared on the screen.

Level 1 
 Jungle Fever: A jungle setting where the player climbed palm trees to obtain three bunches of bananas at the top while avoiding coconut-throwing monkeys, as well as toucans, piranhas (seen once the player was above the waterfall) and snakes. The player could go behind the waterfall, or touch a golden idol to cause a rope to appear to help cross the waterfall safely.
 Alien Moonbase: An intergalactic mechanical building where the player had to turn off three anti-matter reactors, while trying to avoid steam vents and attacking robots. Touching the main computer would immobilize all enemies and hazards, rendering them harmless for five seconds, and would also activate a "light bridge", which made the reactors easier to reach.
 Ancient Tomb: A Mayan temple where the player had to grab three coins on both levels while trying to avoid bats, a statue's hammer, arrows shot from the ground, fireballs, and a mummy. Touching a beam of sunlight eradicated all enemies and unlocked all doors, revealing the hidden coins. (This level appeared in season 1 only.)

Season 2 only 
 Monsters on the Loose: A city besieged by alien UFOs, where now the giant player had to rescue three humans from being abducted by the UFOs, while avoiding monsters such as a giant laser-firing eyeball, a slimy earth-burrowing creature, and a monstrous cockroach. Touching a power rod released cosmic radiation, clearing the screen of all enemies and thus leaving the player unhindered for a few seconds.
 Haunted Museum: A haunted mansion scene, where the player was required to pick up three statue busts hidden inside moving bookcases, while avoiding monsters such as a gargoyle, grasping tentacles, a vampire, and the "Hand of Doom". Pulling back a curtain bathed the room in sunlight, destroying all enemies and thus leaving the player unhindered for a few seconds.

Level 2 
 Runaway Rail Car: The player traveled on a railway car through a Wild West town and abandoned mines; he or she had to obtain three coins while avoiding vultures, hanging timbers, cactuses, tumbleweeds and rats. If the player touched a green "luck stone," he or she regained full power. (This level appeared in season 1 only.)
 Nile River Raft: The player, floating on a fast-moving Egyptian river with a wooden raft, had to grab three gems while avoiding flies, alligators, rats, vultures and a mummy. Touching the legendary "Eye of the Pharaoh" diamond restored full power.
 Mine Maze: A Mayan room gauntlet where the player had to collect three coins while dodging fireballs, spears, and electrified floor tiles. If the player touched a "Power" tile, he or she was granted immunity to all damage for a few seconds.
 Cliffhanger: Taking place on a cliff with a network of caves, the player had to clear the cave openings to find three coins while avoiding rock slides, snakes, vultures and giant lizards. Touching a TNT device blasted open the cave openings, thus revealing all the coins.
 Food Fight: A school lunch room setting where a food fight was taking place. The player had to grab three textbooks scattered on the floor, while avoiding flying food and the gym coach. Opening a locker with stinky gym shoes stopped the chaos for five seconds.

Season 2 only 
 Sub Search: An ocean scene with the player in a waverunner; the player had to collect three treasure chests while avoiding dangers such as sharks, eels, giant lobsters, explosive mines and squids. Touching a nuclear power cell, however, restored all power.
 Enchanted Flight: A magic carpet scene, where the player had to grab three rings while avoiding swordsmen, gate traps, cobras, a royal guard, a baby dragon, guard dogs, and a genie that shot lightning bolts (the same Djinni from the Forgotten Desert in Mikey's World). Touching a magic lamp restored the player's health.
 Snow Slingers: An arctic scene where the player had to hit three elves with snowballs while dodging those of the elves. The player also had to avoid skiing foxes, and hitting an ice-skating polar bear by mistake. Hitting a snowman made it play a song that forced the elves to stop attacking and dance in place for five seconds, making them much easier to hit.

Level 3 aka The Wizard Level 
Both players, sharing one energy gauge, teamed up for the last level, which was a face-off against one of three villains that rotated throughout the show's run, the evil wizard Merlock who conjured lightning bolts, a fireball-throwing sorceress named Scorchia; and the armor-clad monster Mongo who tossed balls of energy. To defeat them, the players had to touch three orbs before time expired, while trying to avoid the Game Wizard and the projectiles he or she was throwing, the ghostly creatures flying around the room, and the beams of lightning, fire, or energy (depending on who the Wizard was) that erupted from the ground. If either player touched a spinning hourglass that randomly appeared, all enemies and hazards would be immobilized and rendered harmless for five seconds.

Upon the Wizard's defeat (if the players succeeded), depending on who the players faced, Merlock would disintegrate into a pile of dust, Scorchia's body would burn to ashes and blow away, and Mongo would vanish in a flash of light, leaving only his armor behind. The message "You did it! You beat the game." would appear across the screen. In the game show's history, there is only one episode when one team won the grand prize where they defeated the wizard with one second left on the clock, the screen turned to red, and the words "GAME OVER" appeared on the screen, instead of leaving the screen colorized and "You did it! You beat the game." appearing on the screen. (possibly because of an error)

In Season 1, the Wizards had nearly identical rooms (with only different color schemes depending on the Wizard with Merlock in a purple room, Scorchia in a red-orange room, and Mongo in a green room). In Season 2, the mechanics were the same as before, but each Wizard was given a more customized room to better fit his or her theme as follows:
Merlock's lair has bubble-like objects
Scorchia's lair has crystals
Mongo's lair is a frosty snow cave

Pilot 
The show taped four pilots, with a videotape of one of the episodes available. The format was basically the same, but there were some differences. Phil Moore and Andrea Lively were not the host and announcer. Instead, it's Niells Schurman and Fran Gauchi. The episode was taped on the same set as Get the Picture. The team colors were red and blue. Blue was changed to yellow because if blue made it to the Video Zone, the body of the blue contestants would disappear due to the blue screen being used in the Video Zone. The face-off games were much slower. The theme music was the same theme from a previous Nickelodeon show, Outta Here. The sound effects were from Double Dare and Get the Picture. Mikey was animated differently and had no music when he moved to a square. One of the Enemy squares was revealed to the teams before the round started. The Video Challenge was called "Arcade." The team that landed on the square sent one player on stage to choose from seven available games (one of the games was Super Mario Bros. 3 for the Nintendo Entertainment System, which would be the only first party game from Nintendo on the show) while the other player stayed at the podium to write down the wager instead of both players coming down, and the person wager writes on a piece of paper instead of a magnetic board. The games were set up in customized TV cabinets instead of arcade style cabinets. Also, games could be played more than once, instead of only being available once a day. The Time Bomb challenge was considered a Video Puzzle and instead of spelling words, required teams to come up with multiple answers to a specific question. The Video Zone was four levels instead of three, with no Wizard in the final level. When a contestant completed a level, the clock would stop, with the host revealing statistics, before the next level began.

Notable celebrities 
 Joey Fatone, later a member of 'N Sync, appeared on season 1, episode 14 of the show as a contestant (using his full given name, Joseph). His team did not make it to the Video Zone.
 The casts of Clarissa Explains it All, Salute Your Shorts, and Welcome Freshmen appeared on three special celebrity episodes to compete for charity during Season 2. In the Salute Your Shorts episode, the game was played as per the normal rules; however in the other two episodes both teams advanced to the Video Zone while Salute Your Shorts had just the winning team moving on.

Attempted Revival 
In 2015, James Bethea and Karim Miteff proposed a spiritual successor to Nick Arcade on Kickstarter, called Enthlevel. The proposed show would again be hosted by Phil Moore, and update the chroma key technology of the original to incorporate modern advancements in motion capture and virtual reality. The Kickstarter was not able to meet its proposed US$350,000 goal.

References

External links 
 Nickelodeon Arcade @ Bethea-Miteff Productions, Inc.
 Nickelodeon Arcade page at Travis' Game Show Jackpot site
 Nickelodeon Arcade Review Page
 Phil Moore revives Nick Arcade at SUPER! BitCon
 GitHub repository of open source recreation of the "Mikey" board
 

Nickelodeon game shows
1990s American children's game shows
1992 American television series debuts
1992 American television series endings
1990s Nickelodeon original programming
Television shows about video games
Esports television
English-language television shows
Television shows filmed in Florida
Television series by CBS Studios